"Baba" Gündüz Kılıç (29 October 1918 – 17 May 1980) was a Turkish football player and coach. He was Ali Kılıç's son and Altemur Kılıç's brother.

Biography 
Born in 1918 in Istanbul, Gündüz Kılıç attended Galatasaray Lycee and then started his football career as a center forward with Galatasaray SK. He was strong, big, well-educated, sophisticated, charismatic, charming and hungry for success. He never looked flashy, yet was never boring. Kılıç was the mastermind behind the rise of Turkish football schooling football players that would become respectable managers after their career. He was also part of Turkey's squad at the 1936 Summer Olympics, but he did not play in any matches.

He took a break from his career in 1938, moving to Germany for a university education. When he returned to Turkey, he again wore the Galatasaray shirt and won two league championships with the team. Kılıç, who played 11 matches with the Turkey national football team, played for Galatasaray until 1953 except he played for Ankara Demirspor during his national service military obligation.
His 5 goals against Beşiktaş JK are still a record for all 3 Istanbul derbies. His 5 goals were scored in the 43' (1-1), 58' (4-1), 73' (5-2), 76' (6-2) and 89' (9-2) minute.

The "Gündüz Kılıç Revolution" started early one morning at Galatasaray in 1952, when he hung his uniform in his locker and put on his coaching suit and whistle without looking back. Once the captain of the Galatasaray team, Gündüz Kılıç coached his former teammates and the bright young talents he added to the squad. He led his team to several championships after eighteen years without a championship between 1934 and 1952. He also transferred Turkish superstar Metin Oktay to the team.

Under Kılıç, Galatasaray reached quarter-finals of the European Cup, with the AC Milan side of Nereo Rocco ending their run.

Every Galatasaray player, student or supporter had found an exemplary man in Gündüz Kılıç: a man who performed so well, motivated so well, educates so well and brought out the very best in every single person he ever worked with. A true gentleman both on and off the field, Gündüz Kılıç helped Galatasaray to reach new targets. Under his leadership, Galatasaray won numerous championships, Turkish Cup titles and international matches.

His visionary coaching style and strong communication skills were to be the backbone of Turkish coaching for many years to come.

The player, whose nickname was "Father", died in New York City, USA on 17 May 1980. His body was transferred to Istanbul and was interred at the Aşiyan Asri Cemetery.

Honours

As player
 Galatasaray
 Milli Küme: 1
1938-1939
 Istanbul Football League: 1
1948-1949
 Istanbul Futbol Kupası: 2
1941-1942, 1942–1943

As manager
 Galatasaray
 Istanbul Football League: 2
1954-1955, 1955–1956
 Süper Lig: 2
1961-1962, 1962–1963
 Turkish Cup: 3
1962-1963, 1964–1965, 1965–1966
 TFF Süper Kupa: 1
1966

References

External links

1918 births
1980 deaths
Turkish footballers
Turkey international footballers
Ankara Demirspor footballers
Galatasaray S.K. footballers
Olympic footballers of Turkey
Footballers at the 1948 Summer Olympics
Turkish football managers
Galatasaray S.K. (football) managers
Beşiktaş J.K. managers
Süper Lig managers
Footballers from Istanbul
Galatasaray High School alumni
Turkey national football team managers
Altay S.K. managers
Burials at Aşiyan Asri Cemetery
Turkish people of Abkhazian descent
Association football forwards